A barangay hall is the seat of government for a barangay, the lowest elected administrative division of the Philippines, below that of a city or municipality. It serves as the office of the barangay captain and meeting place for the Sangguniang Barangay. These officers' names, pictures and responsibilities are usually displayed in the hall. The hall can be considered the counterpart to its municipality's municipal hall.

The barangay hall also serves as a local community center, often providing space for both permanent and temporary services and events. The barangay's day care center and office space for the tanods and the barangay health workers are often located there. Medical missions, religious services, fiestas, and sports contests are often held near or next to the barangay hall.

Gallery

A selection of barangay halls:

See also
Dap-ay

References 

Local government buildings in the Philippines
Barangays of the Philippines